Thomas Stanford (born 1860) was an English footballer who played for Stoke.

Career
Stanford was born in Stoke-upon-Trent and played for Tunstall Park before joining Stoke in 1883. He played in the club's first competitive match in the FA Cup against Manchester in a 2–1 defeat. At the end of the 1883–84 season he joined Congleton.

Career statistics

References

English footballers
Stoke City F.C. players
1860 births
Year of death missing
Association football fullbacks